Chance of a Lifetime is a 1991 American romantic comedy television film directed by Jonathan Sanger and written by Lynn Roth. It stars Betty White, Leslie Nielsen, and Ed Begley, Jr., and aired on NBC on November 18, 1991.

Plot
Workaholic Cleveland business owner Evelyn Eglin receives news from her doctor that she only has six months to live. She sets off on a vacation to Mexico where she meets a man named Lloyd Dixon, and the two fall in love. The pair are both widowers and spend time "learning to live again", but Evelyn soon finds out that her original diagnosis was wrong. Faced with the fact that she has longer than six months, Evelyn has to decide whether she wants to stay in a relationship with Lloyd.

Cast
Betty White as Evelyn Eglin
Leslie Nielsen as Lloyd Dixon
Ed Begley Jr. as Darrel Eglin
Michael Tucci as Randall
William Windom as Dr. Edelman
Ann Turkel as Tippi van Norden
Elaine Stritch as Sybil Sedgwick
Orson Bean as Fred Novins
Annabelle Gurwitch as Sherry
Lincoln Kilpatrick as Amos
Mitzi McCall as Bea
Susan Brown as Barbara

Production
The script was written especially for Betty White. When asked by NBC if there was a project she hadn't done before that she was interested in, she requested "a love story". Filming took place while White's show The Golden Girls was on hiatus. The Mexico scenes were filmed in Oxnard, California.

References

External links

1991 films
1991 romantic comedy films
1990s American films
1990s English-language films
American comedy television films
American romantic comedy films
Films about businesspeople
Films about vacationing
Films about widowhood
Films set in Cleveland
Films set in Mexico
Films shot in Ventura County, California
NBC network original films
Romance television films